The Ceva–Ormea railway is a local railway line of Piedmont in Italy, situated in the province of Cuneo, that connect Ormea to Ceva railway node, crossing the high valley of Tanaro. From 2016 is used only as a tourist railway.

The tourist service is performed by historic trains of Fondazione FS, operated by Trenitalia, on specific dates. Regular traffic was suspended from 17 June 2012, by decision of the Piedmont Region.

History
The railway was opened from 1889 to 1893.

See also 
 List of railway lines in Italy

References

External links

Bibliography 
 RFI - Fascicolo Linea 8

Railway lines in Piedmont
Railway lines opened in 1893
Ceva